True Blue is the fifth album led by saxophonist Hank Crawford featuring performances recorded in 1963 and 1964 for the Atlantic label.

Reception

AllMusic awarded the album 3 stars stating "This lesser-known Hank Crawford set has plenty of enjoyable numbers that fit into the R&Bish soul/jazz idiom."

Track listing
All compositions by Hank Crawford except as indicated
 "Shake-a-Plenty" - 2:36
 "Mellow Down" - 3:01
 "Read 'Em and Weep" - 3:15
 "Merry Christmas Baby" (Lou Baxter, Johnny Moore) - 3:50
 "Save Your Love for Me" (Buddy Johnson) - 3:57
 "Skunky Green" - 2:37
 "Two Years of Torture" (Percy Mayfield, Charles Morris) - 4:27 
 "Blues in Bloom" (Norman Mapp) - 4:14 	
 "Got You on My Mind" (Howard Biggs, Joe Thomas) - 3:12
 "Shooby" - 4:24

Personnel 
Hank Crawford - alto saxophone
Julius Brooks (tracks 2, 4 & 8), Phil Guilbeau (tracks 3 & 5-7), John Hunt, Charlie Patterson (tracks 1, 9 & 10) - trumpet 
Wilbur Brown (tracks 1, 2, 4 & 8-10), James Clay (tracks 3 & 5-7) - tenor saxophone
Leroy Cooper (tracks 2-8), Alexander Nelson (tracks 1, 9 & 10) - baritone saxophone
Sonny Forriest - guitar (tracks 3 & 5-7)
Charles Green (tracks 2, 4 & 8), Edgar Willis (tracks 3 & 5-7), Lewis Worrell (tracks 1, 9 & 10) - bass
Bruno Carr (tracks 3 & 5-7), Carl Lott (tracks 1, 9 & 10), Milt Turner (tracks 2, 4 & 8) - drums

References 

1964 albums
Hank Crawford albums
Atlantic Records albums
Albums produced by Nesuhi Ertegun